The local inverse is a kind of inverse function or matrix inverse used in image and signal processing, as well as other general areas of mathematics.

The concept of local inverse came from interior reconstruction of the CT image. One of the interior reconstruction methods was done through that first approximately reconstructs the image outside the ROI (region of interest) and then subtracts the re-projection data of the image at outside the ROI from the original projection data; then the above created data are used to make a new reconstruction. This idea can be widened to inverse. Instead of directly making an inverse, the unknowns at the outside of the local region can be first inverted. Recalculate the data from these unknowns (at outside the local region). Subtract this recalculated data from the original data, then the inverse for the unknowns inside the local region is done through the above newly produced data.

This concept is a direct extension of local tomography, generalized inverse and iterative refinement method. It is used to solve the inverse problem with incomplete input data, similar to local tomography. However this concept of local inverse also can be applied to complete input data.

Local inverse for full field of view system or over-determined system

Examples of this kind of matrix  are for example, filtered back-projection method for image reconstruction, the inverse with regularization. In this case an approximate solution can be found as following,

and

A better solution for  can be found as following,

In the above formula  is useless, hence

In the same way, there is

In the above the solution is only divided to as two parts.  is inside the ROI(region of Interest)  is at outside of ROI. f is inside of FOV(field of view) y is outside of FOV.

The two parts can be extended to many parts, in this case, the extended method is referred as the sub-region iterative refinement method method

Local inverse for limited-field-of-view system or under-determined system

It is interested to know the vector x. What is the better solution?

Assume the above matrix inverse exists  

The local inverse algorithm is as follows:

(1) .  An extrapolated  function is obtained by

(2) . An approximate  function is calculated by

(3) .

(4) .

(5) . An extrapolated  function is obtained by

(6) . A local inverse solution is obtained

In the above algorithm, there are two time extrapolations for  functions which are used to overcome the data truncation problem. This correction can be a constant correction to correct the DC values of  function or a linear correction according to the prior knowledges about the  function. This algorithm can be found in reference.

In the example of reference, it is found that , here . In that example the constant correction is made. More complicated correction can be made, for example linear correction, which perhaps achieves better results.

is close to 

Shuang-ren Zhao defined a Local inverse to solve the above problem. First consider the simplest solution.

or

Here  is the correct data in which there is no the influence of the object function in outside. From this data it is easy to get correct solution,

or

Here  is a correct(or exact) solution of the unknown , that means 
. In case that  is not a square matrix or it has no inverse, generalized inverse can applied,

On the above solution the result  is related to the unknown vector . Since  can be any values, this way the result  has very strong artifacts which is

This kind of artifact is referred as truncation artifacts in the field of CT image reconstruction. In order to minimize the above artifacts of the solution, a special matrix  is considered, which satisfies

Hence,

solve the above equation with Generalized inverse

Here  is generalized inverse of the matrix .
It is easy to find a matrix Q which satisfy ,  can be written as following:

This kind of matrix  is referred as transverse projection of matrix 

Here  is the generalized inverse of the matrix .  satisfies

It can be proven that

It is easy to prove that 

and hence

Hence Q is also the generalized inverse of Q

That means

Hence,

or

The matrix

 is referred as the local inverse of Matrix 

. Using local inverse instead of generalized inverse or inverse can avoid the artifacts from unknown input data. Considering,

Hence there is,

Hence  is only related the correct data . This kind error can be calculated as

This kind error are called bowl effect. Bowl effect does not related the unknown object  , it is only related the correct data 

This result is same as local tomography, hence local inverse is a direct extension of the concept of the local tomography.

It is well known that the solution of the generalized inverse is a minimal L2 norm method. Hence the local inverse is also a direct extension of the concept of the generalized inverse.

See also
Formulation of the Jacobian conjecture
Interior image reconstruction of CT scans
interior reconstruction
extrapolation
matrix inverse
generalized inverse
iterative refinement
Local tomography

References

Inverse functions